The National Collegiate Athletic Association volleyball tournament occurs every second semester of the academic year. It is divided into three divisions: the Juniors division for high school male students and the Seniors division which is subdivided into Men's Senior division for male college students and Women's Senior division for female college students.

Champions by season
Triple Championships:

Number of championships by school

NOTES

 LSGH won its five championships under the junior team of DLSU. Currently, they play under De La Salle-College of Saint Benilde as their junior team.

Statistics (Final Four Era)
 Longest championship streaks

 Longest championship droughts

 Elimination sweeps

Notes:
a. The Arellano Lady Braves swept the single elimination round, however, NCAA Season 95 volleyball tournaments were discountinued due to the COVID-19 pandemic in the Philippines.

Special awards

Most valuable players

Rookie of the Year

Individual awards

Men's Division

Women's Division

Boys' Division

Girls' Division

Season rankings 
Below are rankings per division per team in the Final Four era:

Men's division

Current teams

Former teams

Women's division

Current teams

Notes:

Former teams

Boys' division

Current teams

Former teams

Notes:
a.The Mapúa High School was closed down in 2005. Since 2008, the Malayan High School of Science Red Robins represented Mapúa University in the juniors' division.

Girls' division

Current teams

See also
NCAA Beach Volleyball Championship
Shakey's V-League
UAAP Volleyball Championship

References

Volleyball
College men's volleyball tournaments in the Philippines
College women's volleyball tournaments in the Philippines
Volleyball competitions in the Philippines